Lake Manitou is the largest lake on Manitoulin Island in Ontario, Canada.
it is the largest lake on a lake island in the world.
It is drained by the Manitou River. 

There are several small islands in Lake Manitou, such as Roper Island and Bear Island in the very south of the western lobe of the lake, and McCracken's Island in the neck connecting the two lobes, making them islands in a lake on an island in a lake. However, none of the islands are as large as Treasure Island in a neighboring, smaller lake on Manitoulin Island.

See also
List of lakes in Ontario

References

External links

Lakes of Manitoulin Island